Alciphronia is a genus of butterflies in the family Lycaenidae. It was originally described as subgenus of Heodes. Its taxonomic status is doubtful.

References

Lycaenidae
Lycaenidae genera